Stephen Gilbert Britton (September 21, 1891 – June 20, 1983) was a shortstop in Major League Baseball who played in three games for the Pittsburgh Pirates in 1913. He played minor league baseball for the Clay Center Cubs of the Central Kansas League.

References

External links

1891 births
1983 deaths
Major League Baseball shortstops
Pittsburgh Pirates players
Baseball players from Kansas
People from Parsons, Kansas
Abilene Red Sox players
Abilene Reds players
Houston Buffaloes players
Clay Center Cubs players
Cleveland Green Sox players
St. Joseph Drummers players
Wichita Witches players
Colorado Springs Millionaires players